European route E 652 is a European B class road in Austria and Slovenia, connecting the cities Klagenfurt – Naklo

Itinerary
The E 652 routes through two European countries:

 : Klagenfurt - Loibltunnel

 
 : Predor Ljubelj - Naklo

External links 
 UN Economic Commission for Europe: Overall Map of E-road Network (2007)
 International E-road network

International E-road network
Roads in Austria
Roads in Slovenia